Rene E. Maglanque is a Filipino politician who currently served as mayor of Candaba since 2019, having previously held this post from 2013 until 2016.

On July 17, 2020, Maglanque tested positive for COVID-19. His vice mayor Michael Sagum became acting vice mayor of the municipality after he diagnosed with the disease, according to him.

References 

Living people
PDP–Laban politicians
Year of birth missing (living people)